Sidi Yahya Ou Youssef is a commune in Midelt Province of the Drâa-Tafilalet administrative region of Morocco. At the time of the 2014 census, the commune had a total population of 4637 people living in 942 households.

References

Populated places in Midelt Province
Rural communes of Drâa-Tafilalet